Louiseville is a town in the Mauricie region of the province of Quebec in Canada. It is located near the mouth of the 'Rivière-du-Loup', on the north shore of Lac Saint-Pierre.

Louiseville is twinned with Soissons in France and Cerfontaine in Belgium.

History
The area was originally part of the la Seignorie Rivière-du-Loup. This seignory was formed in 1665 by Intendant Jean Talon and granted in 1672 to Charles Dugey Rozoy-de-Mannereuil, officer in the Carignan Regiment. The seignory was thereafter also known as Rivière-Mannereuil for some time.

In 1714, a mission was formed by the Récollets who dedicated it to the patronage of Anthony of Padua. In 1722, the Ursulines owned the seignory and attempted to change the name to Saint-Antoine-de-la-Rivière-Saint-Jean but the settlement became known as Rivière-du-Loup or Rivière-du-Loup-en-Haut after the seignory or local river.

In 1816, its post office opened. In 1845, the Parish Municipality of Rivière-du-Loup-en-Haut was formed, and abolished two years later in 1847. It was reestablished in 1855 as Saint-Antoine-de-la-Rivière-du-Loup, named after the parish patron and the seignory. In 1878, the main settlement separated from the parish municipality and formed the Village Municipality of Rivière-du-Loup. Just one year later it was renamed to Louiseville in order to avoid confusion with another town called Rivière-du-Loup in the Bas-Saint-Laurent region. The new name was a tribute to Princess Louise, viceregal consort of Canada, the third daughter of Queen Victoria, who had planned to visit the Mauricie that same year.

On January 1, 1989, the parish and village municipalities merged again and became the Town of Louiseville.

Demographics 

Population trend:
 Population in 2011: 7517 (2006 to 2011 population change: 1.1%)
 Population in 2006: 7433
 Population in 2001: 7622
 Population in 1996: 7911
 Population in 1991: 8000

Mother tongue:
 English as first language: 0.9%
 French as first language: 97.6%
 English and french as first language: 0.6%
 Other as first language: 0.9%

Notable residents
Marcelle Ferron,  (January 29, 1924 – November 19, 2001), a painter and stained glass artist
Pierre “Doc” Mailloux (January 14, 1949), controversial psychiatrist and radio show host

References

External links
 

 
Cities and towns in Quebec